Patrick Stephen Hape is a former American football fullback and tight end for the Denver Broncos, Tampa Bay Buccaneers, and Houston Texans of the NFL.

Patrick Hape played four seasons with the Tampa Bay Buccaneers as a tight end, and five seasons with the Denver Broncos, although he did not play in 2005. His career high in receptions came in 2001 when he had 15 catches for 96 yards and 3 touchdowns in his first year with the Broncos.   In eight seasons, Hape grabbed 51 receptions for 287 yards and 11 touchdowns. 22% of his career receptions were touchdowns. He also scored the first regular-season touchdown at Invesco Field at Mile High.

In December 2000, Hape was fined $5,000 by the NFL for excessive end zone celebration with teammates Keyshawn Johnson and Dave Moore.

He was known for his versatility, outstanding blocking, durability in remaining rather injury-free, reliability near the goal line, ability to play the H-Back position (a position developed by coach Joe Gibbs), and a colorful personality in the locker room.

He signed a three-year, $1.7 million contract with the Broncos in April 2004, only to be cut by Denver on August 30, 2005.

In late May 2006, free agent Patrick Hape was briefly reunited with his former offensive coordinator, Gary Kubiak, signing a contract with the Houston Texans after being out of the league in 2005. He was released by the Texans less than three months later, essentially ending his active NFL career. He is no longer listed as an active NFL player, nor has he explicitly retired.

Hape is also friends with former-Buccaneer teammate Mike Alstott.

As a Buccaneer, he wore jersey number 82. As a Bronco, he switched to number 86. In his brief stint as a Texan in 2006, he wore number 45.

He is an avid golfer, winning the Town of Castle Rock Celebrity Golf Tournament in 2004, playing with other Denver Bronco teammates.

He went on bowling excursions to bolster team chemistry while in Denver with then-Bronco teammates including Matt Lepsis, Tom Nalen, and Jeb Putzier.

The future NFLer earned all-state accolades while playing tight end, linebacker and running back at Brooks High School in Alabama. Hape rushed for 660 yards and scored seven touchdowns as a prep. At the University of Alabama, Hape majored in Business Management. Patrick is currently a financial advisor at Merrill Lynch.

References 

American football tight ends
American football fullbacks
Tampa Bay Buccaneers players
Denver Broncos players
Houston Texans players
Alabama Crimson Tide football players
People from Killen, Alabama
Living people
1974 births